Globe Flower Lake is a lake on Vancouver Island west of Buttle Lake.

References

Alberni Valley
Lakes of Vancouver Island
Strathcona Provincial Park
Nootka Land District